Neolamprologus caudopunctatus is a species of cichlid endemic to Lake Tanganyika, where it occurs along the Zambian shores.

It has a silvery-beige colored body, accented only by a distinctive, goldish-orange dorsal fin and blue eyes. Its tail fin and flanks have pearly spots that are visible if the light hits them at the correct angle. These spots that spatter the tails of both males and females have earned it the name caudopunctatus, meaning "spotted tail."

Despite being a monomorphic species, there are a few subtle traits that can help distinguish males from females. Males also tend to show a slightly more intense coloration.

References

caudopunctatus
Fauna of Zambia
Taxa named by Max Poll
Fish described in 1978
Taxonomy articles created by Polbot